Kedar Paswan (1920-2016) was an Indian politician. He was elected to the Lok Sabha, the lower house of the Parliament of India from the Rosera in Bihar as a member of the Samyukta Socialist Party.

References

External links
Official biographical sketch in Parliament of India website

Samyukta Socialist Party politicians
India MPs 1967–1970
1920 births
2016 deaths
Indian National Congress politicians from Bihar